Merlimau is a state constituency in Malacca, Malaysia, that has been represented in the Melaka State Legislative Assembly.

The state constituency was first contested in 1995 and is mandated to return a single Assemblyman to the Melaka State Legislative Assembly under the first-past-the-post voting system. , the State Assemblyman for Merlimau is Muhammad Akmal Salleh from United Malays National Organisation (UMNO) which is part of the state's ruling coalition, Barisan Nasional (BN).

Definition
The Merlimau constituency contains the polling districts of Ayer Merbau, Jasin Lalang, Merlimau Utara, Merlimau Pasir, Sempang, Pengkalan Samak and Permatang Serai.

Demographics

History

Polling districts
According to the gazette issued on 31 October 2022, the Merlimau constituency has a total of 7 polling districts.

Representation history

Election results
The electoral results for the Merlimau state constituency in 2004, 2008, 2013 and 2018 are as follows. Also included the 2011 Merlimau by-election results.

References

Malacca state constituencies